Roberto de Jesus Assis (born 5 May 1969), known as Roberto de Jesus or just Roberto, is a Brazilian football manager and former player who played as a central defender. He is the current assistant manager of Santa Cruz.

Playing career
Born in Salvador, Bahia, Roberto began his senior career with Industrial in 1990. After playing for lowly sides in the São Paulo state, he moved to Tubarão in 1999 before joining Figueirense later in the same year.

Roberto moved to Joinville for the 2001 season, and signed for Série A side Paraná in July of that year. He returned to JEC in 2002 before again playing in the top tier for Paraná.

In April 2003, Roberto returned to Joinville. He moved to Santa Cruz in January 2004, and retired with the club in 2008.

Managerial career
Shortly after retiring, Roberto was named manager of Fernandópolis, a club he represented as a player. He was appointed in charge of Central, being also shortlisted to the Best Manager of the 2009 Campeonato Pernambucano.

On 24 January 2011, after more than a year without a club, Roberto was named manager of Ypiranga-PE, but was sacked on 20 March. He took over Pesqueira in 2014, but was dismissed on 15 January 2015.

On 10 January 2018, Roberto was named at the helm of América-PE. He was relieved of his duties on 12 February 2019, and returned to Santa Cruz in February 2021 as an assistant.

In April 2021, Roberto was an interim manager of Santa, after João Brigatti was sacked.

Honours

Player
Joinville
Campeonato Catarinense: 2001

Santa Cruz
Campeonato Pernambucano: 2005

References

External links

1969 births
Living people
Sportspeople from Salvador, Bahia
Brazilian footballers
Association football defenders
Campeonato Brasileiro Série A players
Tanabi Esporte Clube players
Fernandópolis Futebol Clube players
Botafogo Futebol Clube (SP) players
Nacional Atlético Clube (SP) players
União Agrícola Barbarense Futebol Clube players
Figueirense FC players
Joinville Esporte Clube players
Paraná Clube players
Santa Cruz Futebol Clube players
Brazilian football managers
Central Sport Club managers
América Futebol Clube (PE) managers
Santa Cruz Futebol Clube managers